José "Pepe" Sánchez Vidaña (3 December 1956 – 2 July 2020) was a Spanish manager and professional footballer who played as a central defender.

Vidaña spend 15 seasons on Real Murcia, for the club he played on La Liga and won 3 Segunda División titles. He owns the appearances record in the Murcia club with 350 played matches, and was the captain for ten years. A serious knee injury forced his retirement as a player at the end of 1977–78 season.

In July 1994, Vidaña was named new manager of Real murcia. His last club as a manager was Segunda División B club La Unión Atlético on 2011.

Vidaña died of cancer at 63 years old. On his honor, the club named the Gate 9 of Estadio Nueva Condomina with his name.

Honours

Club 
Real Murcia
 Segunda División: 1979–80, 1982–83, 1985–86.

References

1956 births
2020 deaths
Sportspeople from the Province of Almería
Spanish footballers
Footballers from Andalusia
Association football defenders
La Liga players
Segunda División players
Segunda División B players
Tercera División players
Real Murcia players
Girona FC players
Spanish football managers
Segunda División B managers
Tercera División managers
Real Murcia managers